Dim Days of Dolor is the eighth studio album by Norwegian gothic metal band Sirenia. It was released on November 11, 2016 through Napalm Records. It is their first album with French vocalist Emmanuelle Zoldan following the departure of Ailyn.

On October 6, 2016, it was released a lyric video for "The 12th Hour". A music video was made for the song "Dim Days of Dolor"  directed by Owe Lingvall and released on November 11, 2016.

Background 
Dim Days of Dolor was composed in the beginning of 2016, and recorded between June and July of that year in  Morten Veland 's personal recording studio (Audio Avenue Studios) in Tau, Rogaland.  Additional recordings were made at Sound Suite Studios in Marseille.

On July 5,  Sirenia announced that their female vocalist Ailyn Giménez  left the band for "personal reasons". She didn't participate in any of the final recording sessions held for this work, but she recorded the full album in demo version during the early stages.

On August, the album was mixed at Hansen Studios in Ribe, Denmark. The cover artwork was again created by Gyula Havancsák from Hjules Illustration And Design.

On September 8, French mezzo-soprano singer Emmanuelle Zoldan  was  officially announced as the new female vocalist, once the instrumental recordings and mixed were finished. Later, her vocal tracks were included.

The album was performed live for first time in Postbahnhof, Berlin on November 10, at the beginning of an extensive European tour.

One of the notable aspects is the little presence of Veland's harsh vocals, and the less participation of the traditional French opera choir (The Sirenian Choir) in most of songs, in comparison to their previous albums.

Track listing

Personnel 
Credits for Dim Days of Dolor adapted from liner notes.

Sirenia
 Morten Veland – harsh vocals (track 3, 9, 10), guitars, bass, keyboards, theremin, drum programming, engineering
 Emmanuelle Zoldan – female vocals, choir vocals, lyrics translation (tracks 9, 12)

Additional musicians
 Joakim Næss – clean male vocals (tracks 2, 6)
 Damien Surian, Mathieu Landry, Emilie Bernou – The Sirenian Choir

Production
 Jacob Hansen – mixing, mastering
 Gyula Havancsák – cover art, design, layout
 Andreas Kalvig Anderson – photography
 Hervé Brouardelle – photography

Chart positions

References

External links 
 Metallum Archives

2016 albums
Sirenia (band) albums
Napalm Records albums